Grotniki may refer to the following places:
Grotniki, Greater Poland Voivodeship (west-central Poland)
Grotniki, Łódź Voivodeship (central Poland)
Grotniki, West Pomeranian Voivodeship (north-west Poland)